Technology Centers, in Oklahoma, are Career and Technical schools which provide career and technology education for high school students in the U.S. state of Oklahoma. The students generally spend part of each day in their respective schools pursuing academic subjects in addition to attending classes in their affiliated vo-tech center. Technology centers are managed by the Oklahoma Department of Career and Technology Education in Stillwater, Oklahoma.

List of centers
Autry Technology Center
Caddo-Kiowa Technology Center
Canadian Valley Technology Center
Chickasha Campus
El Reno Campus
Central Technology Center
Sapulpa Campus
Drumright Campus
Chisholm Trail Technology Center
Eastern Oklahoma County Technology Center
Francis Tuttle Technology Center
Portland Campus
Reno Campus
Rockwell Campus
Gordon Cooper Technology Center
Great Plains Technology Center
Tillman-Kiowa Campus
Lawton Campus
Green Country Technology Center
High Plains Technology Center
Indian Capital Technology Center
Bill Willis Campus
Muskogee Campus
Sallisaw Campus
Stilwell Campus
Kiamichi Technology Center
Atoka Campus
Durant Campus
Hugo Campus
Idabel Campus
McAlester Campus
Poteau Campus
Spiro Campus
Stigler Campus 
Talihina Campus
Meridian Technology Center
Metro Technology Centers
Aviation Career Center
Downtown Business Campus
South Bryant Campus
Springlake Campus
Mid-America Technology Center
Mid-Del Technology Center
Moore Norman Technology Center
Franklin Road Campus
South Penn Campus
Northeast Technology Center
East Campus
North Campus
South Campus
Northwest Technology Center
Alva Campus
Fairview Campus
Pioneer Technology Center
Pontotoc Technology Center
Red River Technology Center
Southern Oklahoma Technology Center
Southwest Technology Center
Tri County Technology Center
Tulsa Technology Center
Broken Arrow Campus
Career Services Center
Lemley Campus
Peoria Campus
Riverside Campus
Training Center
Wes Watkins Technology Center
Western Technology Center
Burns Flat Campus
Hobart 
Sayre Campus
Weatherford Campus

See also
List of school districts in Oklahoma
List of private schools in Oklahoma
List of colleges and universities in Oklahoma

External links
Oklahoma Department of Career and Technology Education

Vocational education in Oklahoma
OK Cooperative Alliance